Fergus Purdie is a Scottish architect. He is a fellow of both the Royal Institute of British Architects and the Royal Incorporation of Architects in Scotland.

In 2018, Purdie put forward a design to revamp a space off of Guard Vennel in Perth city centre. If it were to be accepted, it would become a temporary events space. The plan was approved, on a city-wide scale, in March 2019.

The offices of Fergus Purdie Architects, which was established in 1993, are at 5A Melville Street in Perth. The company designed the building, known as the Artist Residence, which won several awards.

References

External links

Living people
21st-century Scottish architects
Architects from Perth, Scotland
1993 establishments in Scotland
Fellows of the Royal Institute of British Architects
Fellows of the Royal Incorporation of Architects in Scotland
Year of birth missing (living people)